PL25 (Parseval-Luftschiff 25) was a non-rigid military airship made in 1914/15 by the Luft-Fahrzeug-Gesellschaft in Bitterfeld and was the last single-gondola Parseval. At the same time it was one of the largest non-rigid airships before the second world war. Its maiden flight was on 25 February 1915. It had a slim teardrop-shaped hull.

Operational history 
PL25 served in the Navy, starting with 10 test flights. After 41 reconnaissance missions over the North sea, the ship undertook 34 flights as a training ship based from Tønder.

As defence against enemy aircraft a machine gun stand was fitted to the hull's top.

The ship was stationed from 1915-03-25 to 3. November 1915 at Tønder and from 4. November 1915 to 29. März 1916 in Fuhlsbüttel. Hauptmann Stelling and Hauptmann Manger were its commanders.

PL25 was put out of service on 1916-03-30 and dismantled in the Siemens-Hangar at Berlin-Biesdorf (in Marzahn-Hellersdorf, Berlin). PL 25 made 95 flights.

Specifications

See also

Notes

References
 :de:Parseval PL25, German Wikipedia entry

1910s German patrol aircraft
Airships of Germany
Airships of the Imperial German Navy
Aircraft first flown in 1915